Love Is Never Silent is a 1985 Hallmark Hall of Fame television film aired on NBC December 9, 1985 and stars Mare Winningham and Cloris Leachman. It is based on the novel In This Sign by Joanne Greenberg.

The film won two Emmy awards for direction and for best drama special. It received a further three nominations, including one for Winningham's performance. The Movie Scene gives the film a favorable review. In a contemporary review, The New York Times argues that the film is rather long-winded and criticizes the mother's actions but compliments it on being quite tough and a "handsome production".

Plot
The film begins in the 1930s and takes place over the following twenty years. Ten-year old Margaret Ryder is a hearing child of deaf parents. After her younger brother is killed in an accident, she has to negotiate a price for his coffin, as her parents are unable to communicate with the speaking world. Margaret assists her parents at all times, but sometimes feels left out of the hearing world, as her parents don't encourage her to mix with others. Her only true friend is Mr. Petrakis, an immigrant from Greece who used the radio to learn English. As Margaret gets older, she excels in high school math and on graduating high school, Margaret gets a job.

At work, she meets William Anglin, who asks her out. She turns him down multiple times as she is still living with and helping her parents in their new house. She finally accepts as he is enlisted in the war. They develop a romance and write to each other while he is gone. William comes home for a few days and they quickly marry as he is due to go back the next day. Margaret's parents are furious, but they eventually agree to meet his family.

William comes home from the war early after an injury and stays with Margaret and her parents for a few weeks until he is accepted into a university. They move out of her family home and into a small university apartment. Margaret parents come to visit and are not happy with the accommodation they are living in and leave.

Margaret and her parents don't speak for a while until Margaret shows up at their house, pregnant. Her parents begin to argue with her about how well William is providing for her and how responsible she is. Finally she tells them that she has been responsible her whole life as she has had to interpret the world for her parents since she was little. Tearfully, she sits alone in a church and reminisces over her times with Mr. Petrakis, who has recently died.

Margaret gives birth to a son, Marshal. At the Christening, her parents arrive and they are reunited.

Five years later, Margaret's mother is retiring and the factory she worked at is throwing her a party. She stands in front of everyone and signs a speech about how the hearing and deaf are alike and should not be divided.

See also

List of films featuring the deaf and hard of hearing

References

External links

1985 television films
1985 films
1985 drama films
Deaf culture in the United States
Films based on American novels
Hallmark Hall of Fame episodes
Films directed by Joseph Sargent
Primetime Emmy Award for Outstanding Made for Television Movie winners
Films about deaf people
Films scored by Billy Goldenberg
American drama television films
1980s English-language films
1980s American films